Lusitania is a genus of green algae, in the family Coccomyxaceae. Its sole species is Lusitania henriquesii.

References

External links

Scientific references

Scientific databases
 AlgaTerra database
 Index Nominum Genericorum

Trebouxiophyceae genera
Trebouxiophyceae
Monotypic algae genera